The Rosebud River is a major tributary of the Red Deer River in Alberta, Canada. The Rosebud River passes through agricultural lands and ranchland for most of its course, and through badlands in its final reaches. It provides water for irrigation canals through a variety of dams built on its course and that of its tributaries.

The name is a translation of the Cree word Akokiniskway, meaning "the river of many roses".

Course
It flows north and has a dam before it is crossed by Highway 582 and the Canadian Pacific Railway tracks. It receives the waters of Copeley Lake, then turns south through Didsbury, where it is crossed again by Highway 582 and Highway 2A. It then flows in a general south-eastern direction and is crossed by Highway 2 and Highway 581. It continues south-east and is crossed by Highway 72 and Highway 9 north of Irricana and south of Beiseker. It then continues eastwards and flows into southern Alberta, where it is crossed by Highway 21 and Highway 840 at the hamlet of Rosebud. The river then turns north-east, and its course is followed by the Canadian National Railway tracks as it is crossed by Highway 841. After reaching the hamlet of Wayne, it is also followed by Highway 10X through a badlands canyon that reaches  in depth. Eleven bridges cross the river back and forth through the badlands canyon.

Tributaries and crossings
From origin to mouth, the Rosebud River receives the following tributaries or passes through these geographic features:

See also
List of rivers of Alberta

References

Rivers of Alberta